Statistics of Kuwaiti Premier League for the 2000–01 season.

Overview
It was contested by 8 teams, and Al Kuwait Kaifan won the championship.

League standings

References
Kuwait - List of final tables (RSSSF)

2000
2000–01 in Asian association football leagues
1